Rhagium bifasciatum, sometimes called the two-banded longhorn beetle, is one of the most common longhorn beetles in Europe, Turkey and the Caucasus, although it is absent from the far north-east of Europe and some offshore islands, such as Malta.

Like other longhorn beetles, R. bifasciatum lays its eggs in dead wood, mostly of coniferous trees, where they bore deep, broad tunnels until they are ready to pupate after about two years. The adults feed on a wide variety of coniferous and broad-leaved trees.

References

External links

Lepturinae
Beetles of Europe
Beetles described in 1775
Taxa named by Johan Christian Fabricius